Barringtonia macrocarpa grows as a shrub or tree up to  tall, with a trunk diameter of up to . Habitat is lowland riverine and swamp forest. B. macrocarpa is found in Burma, Thailand, Vietnam, Malaysia and Indonesia.

References

macrocarpa
Plants described in 1842
Flora of Indo-China
Flora of Malesia